Acalypha lyonsii is a rare species of plant in the spurge family Euphorbiaceae. Endemic to the Wet Tropics of Queensland, Australia.

References 

lyonsii
Flora of Queensland
Vulnerable biota of Queensland